The All Japan Championship (also: Japan Championship) is an annual international pool tournament founded by Kazuo Fujima in 1967, when there was an all-around completion with multiple disciplines. In the Men's tournament the current discipline is Ten-ball, however for the Women's tournament it is played in the discipline of Nine-ball. The All Japan Championship is currently sanctioned by the JPBA (Japan Professional Pocket Billiard Association). The first 20 years only held men's competitions. It was not until the 21st competition in 1988 that the women's event was established. Most of the competition period is after the middle of November each year. This is the most famous international large-scale pool event held in Japan, and one of the oldest tournaments in pool. Takeshi Okumura has won the men's tournament the most times, sixteen. Akimi Kajitani, Liu Hsin-mei & Pan Xiaoting have won the women's tournament the most times, three.

Tournament history

Men

Women

Japan Open 
In addition to the All Japan Championship another tournament known as the Japan Open played in the discipline of Nine-ball for men and women. However, from 2011 to present, the men's tournament was played in the discipline of Ten-ball. The event began in 1988 and the year after for women and the event has continued for over 30 years. Takeshi Okumura is the most successful player having won the tournament four times. Akimi Kajitani is the most successful player having won the women's tournament the most times, three.

Men

Women

References

External links 

Pool tours and series